Clarksville is a city in Butler County, Iowa, United States, along the Shell Rock River. The population was 1,264 at the 2020 census.

Geography
Clarksville is located at 42°46'58" North, 92°40'11" West (42.782665, -92.669842).

Demographics

2010 census
As of the census of 2010, there were 1,439 people, 573 households, and 401 families living in the city. The racial makeup of the city was 98.0% White, 0.1% African American, 0.2% Native American, 0.4% Asian, 0.1% Pacific Islander, 0.1% from other races, and 1.1% from two or more races. Hispanic or Latino of any race were 1.2% of the population.

There were 573 households, of which 31.2% had children under the age of 18 living with them, 53.8% were married couples living together, 10.3% had a female householder with no husband present, 5.9% had a male householder with no wife present, and 30.0% were non-families. 25.5% of all households were made up of individuals, and 12.6% had someone living alone who was 65 years of age or older. The average household size was 2.43 and the average family size was 2.86.

The median age in the city was 40.2 years. 24.7% of residents were under the age of 18; 7.1% were between the ages of 18 and 24; 23.8% were from 25 to 44; 24.1% were from 45 to 64; and 20% were 65 years of age or older. The gender makeup of the city was 47.9% male and 52.1% female.

2000 census
As of the census of 2000, there were 1,441 people, 581 households, and 393 families living in the city. The racial makeup of the city was 99.03% White, none Black or African American, 0.07% Native American, 0.21% Asian, none Pacific Islander, 0.14% from other races, and 0.56% from two or more races. 0.35% of the population were Hispanic or Latino of any race.

There were 581 households, out of which 32.9% had children under the age of 18 living with them, 55.2% were married couples living together, 8.8% had a female householder with no husband present, and 32.2% were non-families. 28.7% of all households were made up of individuals, and 17.7% had someone living alone who was 65 years of age or older. The average household size was 2.38 and the average family size was 2.91.

In the city, the population was spread out, with 25.0% under the age of 18, 6.4% from 18 to 24, 26.6% from 25 to 44, 20.5% from 45 to 64, and 21.6% who were 65 years of age or older.  For every 100 females, there were 85.2 males. For every 100 females age 18 and over, there were 82.0 males.

The median income for a household in the city was $32,857, and the median income for a family was $37,457. Males had a median income of $28,795 versus $20,821 for females. The per capita income for the city was $14,811. About 8.2% of families and 9.7% of the population were below the poverty line, including 13.3% of those under age 18 and 9.6% of those age 65 or over.

Education
Clarksville Community School District operates local public schools.

Notable people
Jeffrey John Downs, participant on season one of A&E's 60 Days In, is a native of Clarksville. He also appeared on season one of BYUtv's Relative Race with his wife Emily.

Clarksville native Maddie Poppe won season 16 of American Idol in 2018.

References

External links
 Official City Website
 School website
 Clarksville Star Newspaper

Cities in Butler County, Iowa
Cities in Iowa